is a Japanese freelance illustrator and manga artist. They have worked on light novel and children's book covers and illustrations as well as game package and character design. They are best known for their illustration work on the Ascendance of a Bookworm by Miya Kazuki.

They won the Dengeki Game Illustration Gold Award in 1998, and their cover art for the Ascendance of a Bookworm won the Kono Light Novel ga Sugoi! in 2018 and 2019.

Biography
From about the time of 5th or 6th grade in elementary school, they began seriously creating drawings, and—in high school—began submitting work to contests. Shiina found work at a game company and did the character designs for Purikura Daisakusen in 1996.

They created the character designs for Tales of Commons (2005), Tales of Wahrheit (2006), and Tales of the World: Material Dungeon (2008) in the Tales of Mobile series of mobile phone games from Bandai Namco Games. In 2008, Shiina worked with fellow artist Haccan on illustrations and package design for The Legend of Heroes: Trails in the Sky from Nihon Falcom.

In 2013, their artwork on the Sagrada Reset light novel series placed ninth in the annual Kono Light Novel ga Sugoi! awards from 
publisher Takarajimasha. Their cover art and illustration work on the Ascendance of a Bookworm light nove series has placed in the top ten in Kono Light Novel ga Sugoi! every year since 2017, and won in 2018 and 2019. They were named the ninth most popular of light novel illustrators in both 2021 and 2022.

Bibliography

Manga
Shiina wrote and illustrated Monochrome Myst, a three-volume manga series published through the Dengeki Comics imprint of Kadokawa Shoten.
Volume 1 (July 2011)
Volume 2 (January 2013)
Volume 3 (March 2014)

They also wrote and illustrated a manga based on The Diary of Anne Frank:
 (January 2018, Kadokawa Shoten)

Art books
Shiina's art has been collected in several volumes:
 (March 2002, ASCII Media Works)
 (December 2002, ASCII Media Works)
 (October 2004, Fujimi Shobo)
Edel Farben (winter 2008, Tenkyudho, no ISBN, produced for Comicket)
 (March 2012, ASCII Media Works)

Cover and interior illustrations
Shiina created the cover and/or interior illustrations for the following works:
 by Kazuya Shimura (8 volumes, June 1996 - April 2003, Dengeki Bunko)
 by Mizuhito Akiyama (2 volumes, January - April 2000, Dengeki Bunko)
 by Yoshinobu Akita (10 volumes, October 2000 - October 2004, Fujimi Fantasia Bunko)
 by Taro Achi (2 volumes, September 2001 - April 2002, Dengeki Bunko)
 by Kazuya Shimura (7 volumes, February 2004 - December 2006, Dengeki Bunko)
 by Homare Awamichi (8 volumes, September 2005 - April 2008, Fujimi Fantasia Bunko)
 by Tadaaki Kawato (4 volumes, August 2006 - December 2007, Fujimi Fantasia Bunko)
 by Shinji Sadakane (December 2006, Chuokoron-Shinsha)
 by Mio Wakagi (2 volumes, January 2007 - November 2008, Kadokawa Beans Bunko)
 by En Mikami (4 volumes, January - November 2008, Dengeki Bunko)
Sagrada Reset by Yutaka Kōno (7 volumes, May 2009 - March 2012, Sneaker Bunko)
 by En Mikami (5 volumes, August 2009 - July 2011, Dengeki Bunko)
 by Yutaka Kōno (March 2012, Sneaker Bunko)
 by Fumihiko Shimo (July 2014, Famitsu Bunko)
 by Yōichi Haruna (August 2014, Fujimi L Bunko)
Ascendance of a Bookworm by Miya Kazuki (31 volumes, January 2015 - current, To Books)
 by Sandogasa (4 volumes, January - December 2015, Fujimi Shobo)
 by Saitō (4 volumes, March 2015 - February 2016, Earth Star Novel)
 by Ryūto Ebina (May 2017, Kodansha)
 by Yutaka Kōno (2 volumes, September 2017 - April 2018, Kodansha Ranobe Bunko)
 by Tsukasa Seo (November 2017, Famitsu Bunko)
 by Ryūto Watari (4 volumes, March 2019 - December 2020, Dragon Novels)

Children's books
Shiina illustrated the following children's books:
 by Masumi Asano (3 volumes, February 2009 - December 2010, Kadokawa Shoten)
The Secret Garden by Chihiro Kurihara (based on the Burnett novel) (October 2012, Tsubasa Bunko)
 by Rieko Tazawa (May 2013, Kadokawa Shoten)
A Little Princess, translated by Nanae Sugita (July 2013, Tsubasa Bunko)
Crayon Kingdom Best Collection by Reizō Fukunaga (Aoitori Bunko)
 (November 2011)
 (July 2012)
 (December 2013)
 (December 2014)
 (June 2015)
 (May 2016)
Little House on the Prairie series by Laura Ingalls Wilder, translated by Nagiko Nakamura (Tsubasa Bunko):
 (January 2012)
 (July 2012)
 (June 2014)
Little Lord Fauntelroy, translated by Nanae Sugita (September 2014, Tsubasa Bunko)
The Gift of the Magi / The Last Leaf, translated by various (December 2014, Tsubasa Bunko)
 (February 2016, Aoitori Bunko)
 (September 2016, Aoitori Bunko)
Samurai Hustle (novelization) by Yui Tokiumi (September 2016, Aoitori Bunko)
 (November 2016, Tsubasa Bunko)
 by Taeko Higashi (June 2017, Aoitori Bunko)
 by Yui Tokiumi (October 2017, Aoitori Bunko)

Reception

Awards and recognition
Shiina has been nominated for and won multiple awards.

References

Fantasy artists
Japanese illustrators
Manga artists
Writers who illustrated their own writing
Living people
Date of birth missing (living people)
Year of birth missing (living people)